The 2021–22 Washington Huskies women's basketball team represented the University of Washington during the 2021–22 NCAA Division I women's basketball season. The Huskies, led by first year head coach Tina Langley, played their home games at Alaska Airlines Arena at Hec Edmundson Pavilion in Seattle, Washington and competed as members of the Pac-12 Conference.

Offseason

Coaching change 
On March 15, 2021 following a season with a 7–13 (3–13 Pac-12) record, Jody Wynn was fired as head coach. On April 5, Tina Langley was hired to replace Wynn as head coach.

Departures 
Due to COVID-19 disruptions throughout NCAA sports in 2020–21, the NCAA announced that the 2020–21 season would not count against the athletic eligibility of any individual involved in an NCAA winter sport, including women's basketball. This meant that all seniors in 2020–21 had the option to return for 2021–22.

Incoming

Roster

Schedule

|-
!colspan=9 style=| Regular Season

|-
!colspan=9 style=| Pac-12 Women's Tournament

Source:

See also
2021–22 Washington Huskies men's basketball team

References

Washington Huskies women's basketball seasons
Washington Huskies women
Washington Huskies basketball, women
Washington Huskies basketball, women
Washington Huskies basketball, women
Washington Huskies basketball, women